Wally Cassell (March 3, 1912 – April 2, 2015) was an Italian-born American character actor and businessman.

Early years
Wally Cassell was born as Oswaldo Silvestri Trippilini Rolando Vincenza Castellano. (A 1951 newspaper article gives Cassell's real name as Osvaldo Tripolini Ronaldo Vincennes Castelleno.)
The son of Luigi and Luisa Castellano, Oswaldo was born in Agrigento, Sicily, and moved with his family to the United States when he was two years of age. (Another source says that his parents brought him to Brooklyn, New York, "when I was a babe in arms.") As a youngster, Cassell was a dancer, but he abandoned dancing to concentrate on acting.

Film
Cassell began his film career in 1942, initially working in small, uncredited roles. Mickey Rooney, with whom Cassell appears in the 1950 film noir Quicksand, is credited with suggesting the change of name to Wally Cassell. Rooney is also credited with helping Cassell gain a screen test and a contract with Metro-Goldwyn-Mayer.

His films include The Thin Man Goes Home (1945), The Story of G.I. Joe (1945), The Clock (1945), The Postman Always Rings Twice (1946), Guilty (1947), Loves of Carmen (1948), Saigon (1948), Sands of Iwo Jima (1949), White Heat (1949),Quicksand (1950), City That Never Sleeps (1953), Island in the Sky (1953), Law and Order (1953), Princess of the Nile (1954), Until They Sail (1957), and I, Madman (1989).

Television
Cassell was later cast in two syndicated programs starring Jim Davis: Stories of the Century, in the role of gunman Luke Short, and Rescue 8, as Johnny French in "One More Step."  Cassell also guest-starred in several television series, including The Loretta Young Show (1955), as "Oley" in James Arness's TV Western series Gunsmoke in the 1956 episode "Hack Prine" (S1E26), the 1959 premiere episode of The Untouchables ("The Empty Chair"), Rawhide (1960), and The Beverly Hillbillies (1963).

Later years
Cassell retired from acting in 1964 and became a successful businessman.

Personal life and death
Cassell was married to actress and singer Marcy McGuire from August 30, 1947, until his death. Cassell's daughter, Cindy Cassell, became an actress. At age 13, she had the role of Pony Hutchinson in the Walt Disney Studios film Emil and the Detectives (1964).

Cassell died at his home in Palm Desert, California in 2015 at age 103.

Filmography

References and notes

External links

 
 
 

1912 births
2015 deaths
20th-century American male actors
Italian emigrants to the United States
American male film actors
American male television actors
Male Western (genre) film actors
People from Mississippi
Male actors from Los Angeles
Businesspeople from California
American centenarians
Italian centenarians
20th-century American businesspeople
Men centenarians